The 1966 United States Senate election in Massachusetts was held on November 8, 1966. Republican incumbent Leverett Saltonstall retired after serving for 22 years. Republican Massachusetts Attorney General Edward Brooke defeated Democratic former Governor of Massachusetts Endicott Peabody in a landslide.

Brooke was the first African-American U.S. Senator elected after the end of Reconstruction and the first ever popularly elected, as Reconstruction ended before the passage of the Seventeenth Amendment to the United States Constitution.

Republican primary

Candidates
 Edward Brooke, Massachusetts Attorney General since 1963
 Alan MacKay, conservative activist

Declined
 Leverett Saltonstall, incumbent Senator since 1945

Campaign
MacKay campaigned against Brooke for refusing to back Barry Goldwater's 1964 presidential campaign. However, Goldwater endorsed Brooke in May.

Results
Brooke won the party endorsement at the June 25 convention and was unopposed in the September primary.

Democratic primary

Candidates
 Thomas Boylston Adams, academic and member of the Adams political family
 John F. Collins, Mayor of Boston
 Endicott Peabody, former Governor of Massachusetts

Results

General election

Candidates
 Edward Brooke, Massachusetts Attorney General since 1963 (Republican)
 Lawrence Gilfedder, perennial candidate (Socialist Labor)
 Endicott Peabody, former Governor of Massachusetts (Democratic)
 Mark R. Shaw, perennial candidate and nominee for Vice President of the United States in 1964 (Prohibition)

Results

See also
 1966 United States Senate elections

References

External links and references
 Race details at ourcampaigns.com

United States Senate
Massachusetts
1966